P. graveolens may refer to:

 Pelargonium graveolens, a plant species found in southern Africa
 Peperomia graveolens, a plant species endemic to Ecuador
 Plectranthus graveolens, a shrub species native to New South Wales and Queensland in Australia
 Psilocybe graveolens, a mushroom species discovered in the salt marshes of Hackensack, New Jersey

See also